Brothers Union is a football club based in Gopibag, Dhaka. The club was founded in 1949 and the regal business tycoon Kazi Ghiyasuddin Ahmed, better known as K. G. Ahmed served as the founder chairman of the club. At the beginning it was a well-known cultural organization. In 1973, the club started their football activities. They played 3rd Division Football League in 1973 and in 1974 and were promoted to 2nd Division in 1975. Brothers also won the title in the same year and as a result this club was promoted to 1st Division. Brothers won their first major title in the year 2004. After they were relegated from BPL in 2021-22 season the club withdrew their name from participating in the BCL. They will return in the BCL for 2022-23 season.

History
On 17 August 2021 Brothers Union lost by 4–0 goals against Muktijoddha Sangsad KC and result of the match confirmed  relegation of the club from Bangladesh Premier League. Its their first ever relegation after formation of the club.

Current squad

Brothers Union Ltd. squad for 2022–23 season.

Coaching staff

Head coach's record

Honours

League
 Dhaka Premier Division League
Champions (2): 2003–04, 2005
 Dhaka Second Division Football League
Champions (1):  1974
 Dhaka Third Division Football League
Champions (1):  1973

Cup
 Bangladesh Federation Cup
Champions (2): 1980*, 1991, 2005
 National Championship
Champions (1): 2004
 Aga Khan Gold Cup
 Champions (1): 1981(shared)

Invitational
 Bordoloi Trophy
Champions (1): 2004

Performance in AFC competitions
 AFC Cup: 2 appearances
2005: Group Stage
2006: Group Stage

Notes

References

External links
 Aga Khan Gold Cup Football, Dacca
 Club page of BFF
 The glorious days of Brothers Union

Association football clubs established in 1949
Sport in Bangladesh
Football clubs in Bangladesh
1949 establishments in East Pakistan